I Start Counting were an electronic music duo from North London. The band consisted of David Baker and Simon Leonard.

Background
Baker and Leonard had met at Middlesex University; both had an affection for pop music. In 1982, they began to DJ together which led them to form the I Start Counting project. Leonard specialized in the technology side and Baker was biased toward the musical side of the project.
They approached Daniel Miller with some demos of their recorded material. These demos led to Mute Records signing the duo in 1984.
Initially they recorded two singles for Mute titled "Letters to a Friend" and "Still Smiling"; both singles were produced by Daniel Miller. Then in 1986, I Start Counting recorded their debut album titled My Translucent Hands. The album was produced by Paul Kendall. In 1987, they supported Erasure on their European tour.  The band's second album was released in June 1989, titled Fused. It included a new version of the track "Lose Him", made up of sampled voices instead of a recorded singer.
In 1990, they recorded some new material, but realized that it sounded quite different from their previous electropop recordings. This new style of dance/techno was released under the name Fortran 5; the band would later change their name again to cater for the Kraftwerk-influenced project known as Komputer.

Discography

Albums
 1986 - My Translucent Hands (Mute Records)
 1989 - Fused (Mute Records)

Singles
 1984 - "Letters to a Friend" (Mute Records)
 1985 - "Still Smiling" (Mute Records)
 1986 - "Catch That Look" (Mute Records)
 1987 - "My Translucent Hands" (Mute Records)
 1988 - "Lose Him" (Mute Records)
 1988 - "Ra! Ra! Rawhide" (Mute Records)
 1989 - "Million Headed Monster" (Mute Records)

Compilations
 1991 - Catalogue (Mute Records) (Elektra Entertainment)

References

External links
 Myspace profile

English electronic music duos
Male musical duos
Mute Records artists
English synth-pop groups
Musical groups from London